WWRF (1380 AM) is a radio station broadcasting a Regional Mexican format. Licensed to Lake Worth Beach, Florida, United States, the station serves the West Palm Beach area.  The station is currently owned by Radio Fiesta, Inc. and features programming from CNN Radio.

History
The station went on the air as WLVS on 1987-03-01.  On 2000-03-15, the station changed its call sign to the current WWRF.

References

External links
Listen Live (via Streema)

WRF
Radio stations established in 1987
1987 establishments in Florida